Nodar Vladimirovich Khashba (born 1951 in Tkvarcheli) is a former prime minister of Georgia's breakaway republic of Abkhazia and a former mayor of Sukhumi.

Khashba was mayor of Sukhumi from 1993 until 1995. Afterwards he became a senior official in Russia's emergencies ministry. In April 2004 he emerged as one of the leaders of a new political movement named United Abkhazia (Yedinaya Abkhazia, reminiscent of the Russian pro-Kremlin party Yedinaya Rossiya). He was not eligible to run in the October 2004 presidential election in Abkhazia because of a requirement that candidates must have been resident in Abkhazia for five years. Shortly after the election, amid confusion surrounding its outcome, the outgoing president, Vladislav Ardzinba, appointed Khashba prime minister.

On November 14, Prime Minister Nodar Khashba, named by the relatives of Tamara Shakryl as responsible for her death and threatened by them, had to spend the night at Russia's Peacemaking Headquarters in Sukhumi. Tensions continued to mount as the day for Bagapsh's inaugural ceremony came. In early December 2004, however, Bagapsh came to an agreement with Khadjimba under which they would run in new elections under a national unity ticket, with Bagapsh as presidential candidate and Khadjimba as vice-presidential candidate. The ticket won the elections with over 90% of the vote, and the new administration took office on February 12, 2005.

References

1951 births
Living people
People from Tkvarcheli District
Prime Ministers of Abkhazia
Mayors of Sukhumi
United Abkhazia politicians